Donald Jay Cohen (September 5, 1940 – October 2, 2001) was an American psychiatrist, psychoanalyst, and director of the Yale Child Study Center and the Sterling Professor of Child Psychiatry, Pediatrics and Psychology at the Yale School of Medicine.  According to the New York Times, he was "known for his scientific work, including fundamental contributions to the understanding of autism, Tourette's syndrome and other illnesses, and for his leadership in bringing together the biological and the psychological approaches to understanding psychiatric disorders in childhood"; his work "reshaped the field of child psychiatry".  He was also known as an advocate for social policy, and for his work to promote the interests of children exposed to violence and trauma.

Personal life and education

Donald Jay Cohen was born in Chicago, Illinois on September 5, 1940. His father was a businessman.  His family says that when he "was five years old he went up to his room to study and never came down". According to his son-in-law and later colleague Andrés Martin, Cohen was an "observant Jew with deep ties to Israel and a lifelong preoccupation with the Holocaust", who described himself as a "Jewish boy of humble origins growing up in Chicago".

Cohen graduated summa cum laude from Brandeis University in 1961, with a BA in philosophy and psychology, and studied philosophy at Cambridge University on a Fulbright fellowship.  He obtained his MD in 1966 from Yale School of Medicine,  and completed his general and child psychiatry residency at Massachusetts Mental Health Center and Children's Hospital, in Boston and Washington, DC. According to The New York Times, Cohen said that "as a student he honed his fund-raising skills working as a copy writer for a mail order catalog, extolling the virtues of women's hats and other merchandise". He was described as "an avid scholar who loved French poetry and German philosophy, as well as science and medicine".

Cohen died in New Haven, Connecticut of ocular melanoma on October 2, 2001, at the age of 61; he was survived by his wife, Phyllis Cohen, a psychoanalyst at the Yale Child Study Center, four children, and five grandchildren, two brothers, and his mother.

Career

Medical
Cohen joined the Yale School of Medicine in 1972.  Along with other researchers, he had begun looking at non-psychological (organic) causes for Tourette syndrome (TS) by 1976.  Cohen was named the director of the Yale Child Study Center in 1983—a position he held until his death in 2001.  In 2000, he was named the Sterling Professor of Child Psychiatry, Pediatrics and Psychology at Yale.  At Yale, he studied personality development, TS management, the effects of stress on developing children, and the interplay between genetic and environmental factors in neuropsychiatric disorders.

According to a former commissioner of the Food and Drug Administration, Cohen "moved child psychiatry into the biological era, but he continued to put emphasis on the psychological and social aspects affecting child development".  According to the Yale Bulletin, Cohen made "groundbreaking contributions in biological psychiatry, clinical care and the development of international collaborations in child psychiatry". As a "pioneer" in autism and Tourette syndrome research, he proposed treatments for TS which "opened new avenues to treating and understanding the disorder".  His colleague Andrés Martin said his work with autism "was in large part devoted to understanding and listening to those same individuals who had been written off as incapable of communicating meaningfully and to following the string of their social communicative mishaps to their deepest core".

At Yale, Cohen helped found the International Working Group on Children and War, and the Yale-New Haven Child Development Community Policing Program, to train first responders to help children exposed to violence and trauma;  police were trained to call in the Yale Child Study Center professionals in instances of violence or trauma involving children. Martin said, "he dedicated much of his later career to addressing the mental health needs of children in poor and war-torn nations".

Appointments

Cohen became a vice-president of the International Association of Child and Adolescent Psychiatry and Allied Professions (IACAPAP) in 1986, and was president from 1992 to 1998, where his work fostered "international collaborations in research and clinical care".   According to the Yale Bulletin, he was proud of his work in helping to promote child psychiatry in Gaza and in creating the Eastern Mediterranean Association of Child and Adolescent Psychiatry and Allied Professions (EMACAPAP), for which he served as chair of the international scientific committee. He served as vice-president of the board of governors of Yale University Press, was an analyst at the Western New England Institute of Psychoanalysis, and was a member of the Institute of Medicine of the National Academy of Sciences.  He held additional chair appointments with the Child Health and Development Institute, the International President of the Telefon Azzuro Foundation in Italy, and Schneider Children's Hospital of Israel.  He served on editorial boards in the United States as well as in France, Israel, and Great Britain.

Other achievements

Cohen was also known as an "institutional builder";  he is credited with transforming three buildings at Yale to help give the Yale Child Study Center prominence (the Children's Psychiatric Inpatient Service, the Harris-Provence Child Development Unit, and the Nelson and Irving Harris Building), obtaining "prominent and central locations at the medical school for each of these buildings". He also helped bring kosher kitchens to the university.

Publications

Cohen authored or co-authored more than 300 professional articles and 159 book chapters, including "the definitive textbooks on pervasive developmental disorders and on tic disorders". His books include:
 Handbook of Autism and Pervasive Developmental Disorders, Diagnosis, Development, Neurobiology, and Behavior (volume 1), 
 Tourette's Syndrome -- Tics, Obsessions, Compulsions: Developmental Psychopathology and Clinical Care, 
 Tourette's Syndrome and Tic Disorders: Clinical Understanding and Treatment, 
 Life Is with Others: Selected Writings on Child Psychiatry, 
 The Yale Child Study Center Guide to Understanding Your Child: Healthy Development from Birth to Adolescence, 

He inspired the production of the "first Israeli textbook of child psychiatry in Hebrew, the first modern textbook of child psychiatry in China and a new textbook of child psychiatry in South Korea".

Legacy
Colleagues said Cohen "blended a profound spirituality with a broad understanding of science and clinical work"; friend Joe Lieberman described him as someone who "did more in his 61 years than most anyone else could ever hope to accomplish in a lifetime ... a true professional, and caregiver and friend to the thousands of people who had the good fortune of knowing him" and a person who "dedicated his life to helping children and adolescents ... working tirelessly to develop and promote programs to assist children".  He was described as "a humanist, with tremendous compassion and insight into his patients". Colleague James F. Leckman said, "He fostered the development of the next generation of academic child psychiatrists from many countries, in Europe, Korea, China, as well as Israel", and described him as "committed to forging closer ties between Israel and Palestine through contacts and visits with various psychiatrists, psychologists, and social service agencies active in Gaza and the West Bank."

According to Leckman and colleague Joseph L. Woolston, Cohen's "ability to put children and adults at ease" was "just magical"; Leckman said of Cohen, "To be a good child psychiatrist, you have to be a child at heart, and Donald was always willing to be sort of down there on the floor with the kids."  But he was also known for engaging parents; according to the National Child Traumatic Stress Network:Regardless of the disorder he was studying, Dr. Cohen engaged parents to an unprecedented degree. He took their advice in designing his studies and shared his papers with them before submitting them for publication. He called this approach, "participatory research," and the children's families loved him for it.

According to Joe Lieberman:I recently learned from my colleague, Senator Dodd, that Dr. Cohen was the first person to suggest a special health insurance program for children that ultimately became the Children's Health Insurance Program. Today, this program throughout the Nation provides health care for millions of children who would otherwise go without the basic care they need to grow up healthy and flourish.

Recognition
In 2001, The Donald J. Cohen National Child Traumatic Stress Initiative was established "to improve access to care, treatment, and services for children and adolescents exposed to traumatic events and to encourage and promote collaboration between service providers in the field."  The Stress Initiative was a bill by Senator Joe Lieberman and approved by both houses of US Congress to amend the Public Health Service Act to recognize Cohen's contributions to victims of violence-related stress.

In 2002, the Donald J. Cohen and Irving B. Harris Center for Trauma and Disaster Intervention was named at Tel Aviv University to honor Cohen's contributions.

Cohen's work was recognized by the National Commission on Children and the American Psychiatric Association (APA);  he received the Strecker Award from the Institute of the Pennsylvania Hospital and the Agnes Purcell McGavin Award for Prevention from the APA.

Other programs established in his honor include:
 The Donald J. Cohen Fellowship in Developmental Neuroscience at Emory University.
 The Donald J. Cohen Fellowship from the  International Association for Child and Adolescent Psychiatry and Allied Professions.
 The Donald J. Cohen Medical Student Training Program at The Vermont Center for Children, Youth, and Families.

References

1940 births
2001 deaths
Alumni of the University of Cambridge
American psychiatrists
Brandeis University alumni
Jewish physicians
Physicians from Chicago
Tourette syndrome
Yale School of Medicine alumni
Yale Sterling Professors
Yale School of Medicine faculty
20th-century American physicians
Members of the National Academy of Medicine